Peresvetovo-Belitsa is a rural locality in Starobelitsky Selsoviet Rural Settlement, Konyshyovsky District, Kursk Oblast, Russia. Population:

Geography 
The village is located on the Belichka River (a left tributary of the Svapa River), 57 km from the Russia–Ukraine border, 72 km north-west of Kursk, 17.5 km north-west of the district center – the urban-type settlement Konyshyovka, 1 km from the selsoviet center – Staraya Belitsa.

 Climate
Peresvetovo-Belitsa has a warm-summer humid continental climate (Dfb in the Köppen climate classification).

Transport 
Peresvetovo-Belitsa is located 49 km from the federal route  Ukraine Highway, 42 km from the route  Crimea Highway, 23 km from the route  (Trosna – M3 highway), 8 km from the road of regional importance  (Fatezh – Dmitriyev), 12 km from the road  (Konyshyovka – Zhigayevo – 38K-038), 13 km from the road  (Dmitriyev – Beryoza – Menshikovo – Khomutovka), on the road of intermunicipal significance  (38N-144 – Oleshenka with the access road to Naumovka), 2.5 km from the nearest railway halt Grinyovka (railway line Navlya – Lgov-Kiyevsky).

The rural locality is situated 78 km from Kursk Vostochny Airport, 176 km from Belgorod International Airport and 277 km from Voronezh Peter the Great Airport.

References

Notes

Sources

Rural localities in Konyshyovsky District